Legions is the seventh studio album by Danish thrash metal band Artillery, released on 26 November 2013 on Metal Blade Records. It is the first Artillery album to feature vocalist Michael Bastholm Dahl and drummer Josua Madsen.

Track listing

Personnel 
Michael Bastholm Dahl – vocals
Michael Stützer – guitars
Morten Stützer – guitars
Peter Thorslund – bass
Josua Madsen – drums

References 

2013 albums
Artillery (band) albums
Metal Blade Records albums